KHEY (1380 kHz) is a Fox Sports Radio AM affiliate in the El Paso, Texas, United States, area. The station is owned by iHeartMedia, Inc. The station is licensed to broadcast in HD radio, but does not currently broadcast in HD.

Historically, KHEY was one of several country music stations in the El Paso, Texas market, and was the last AM station in the market to keep its country format.  The station was assigned a frequency of 690 AM, owner Clear Channel Communications swapped frequencies with station KTSM in 2000.

Previous logo
 (KHEY's logo under previous ESPN Radio affiliation)

References

External links

HEY
Sports radio stations in the United States
Fox Sports Radio stations
Radio stations established in 1929
1929 establishments in Texas
IHeartMedia radio stations